Caviahue is a ski resort and a village in the municipality of Caviahue-Copahue, Neuquén Province, Patagonia, Argentina. The ski trails are located on the eastern slope of Mount Caviahue, and the base is two km west of the village and just four km east of the limit between Argentina and Chile. The village lies on the shores of Lake Agrio (also known as Lake Caviahue), and the landscape is characterized by Araucaria forests, typical of the region.

The First Argentine Winter Games were celebrated in 2016 in Caviahue.

Ski resort
Caviahue's ski resort has 23 trails, connected by four chairlifts, five T-bars, and two small lifts. Besides alpine skiing, the center offers snowboarding, snowmobiles, snowshoe trekking and cross-country skiing. There are also two kennels offering dogsleds.

See also 

 Cerro Castor
 Chapelco
 Las Leñas
 Cerro Catedral
 List of ski areas and resorts in South America

References

External links
 Official website of the ski resort
 Official website of the municipality of Caviahue-Copahue
 Caviahue Ski Resort in Neuquén, Argentina

Mountains of Argentina
Ski areas and resorts in Argentina